The Bee was a short-lived British literary magazine started by Oliver Goldsmith on 6 October 1759. In it he published "Citizen of the World" and many of his best essays. The last edition of the magazine was published on 24 November 1759.

References

External links

Defunct literary magazines published in the United Kingdom
Magazines established in 1759
Magazines disestablished in 1759